You and Me Forever: Marriage In Light of Eternity is a 2015 New York Times bestselling Christian book written by Francis Chan and Lisa Chan and published by Claire Love Publishing.

Summary 
You and Me Forever tells of the authors' view on how to have a successful marriage with an eternal focus. The overall theme of the book is that the best way to have a great marriage is by not focusing on marriage, but rather, focusing on God. The authors discuss lessons learned in their own marriage and urge their readers to seek Bible scriptures and the voice of God as their source of relational advice.

References

External links 
 

Christian literature
2014 non-fiction books
2014 in Christianity